Franklin L. Dodge, Jr. (July 29, 1891 – November 26, 1968) was a Bureau of Investigation agent in the early 1920s who had an affair with Imogene Remus, the wife of millionaire bootlegger George Remus.

Franklin L. Dodge, Jr. was born in Lansing, Michigan in 1891.  His father, Franklin L. Dodge, Sr. was a prominent lawyer and businessman who served two terms as a representative in the Michigan State Legislature and made several unsuccessful bids for higher office as a Democrat.  Dodge, Jr. joined the Bureau of Investigation, forerunner of today's F.B.I.

While an agent, Dodge was credited for the investigation that led to the conviction of the "Savannah Four", a ring of bootleggers led by Willie Haar.  He proceeded to conduct an undercover investigation of the corrupt practices of Albert Sartain, warden of the Atlanta Federal Prison, who was removed and convicted.  It was during this investigation that he met George Remus, a millionaire bootlegger from Cincinnati who had entered the Atlanta Federal Prison in 1924.  Soon after, Dodge resigned from the Bureau and began an affair with Remus' wife Imogene, who had been given power of attorney to manage Remus' many holdings.  Dodge convinced Imogene to begin liquidating her husband's assets and hide as much money as possible. They also sold Remus's huge Fleischmann distillery, and gave Remus only $100 of the multimillion-dollar empire he created. To protect themselves, they then tried to have Remus deported. When that failed, they paid a hitman $15,000 to kill Remus, which also failed.  The controversy became public when Congressman Fiorello La Guardia, a fierce opponent of Prohibition, detailed records of these transactions on the floor of Congress in March 1926 as an example of how bootlegging profits were corrupting law enforcement.  In October 1927, six months after he was released from prison, Remus shot Imogene to death in broad daylight in a Cincinnati park.  During the murder trial, Remus defended himself by making Dodge and his deceased wife the villains of the tragedy and secured his acquittal by reason of temporary insanity.

Now outside the public eye, Dodge lived the rest of his life in Michigan, where he worked for the Michigan Liquor Control Commission after the end of Prohibition.  He eventually married. He died in 1968 and is buried in Lansing, Michigan.

References

Sources
Brown, Dorothy M.  Mabel Walker Willebrandt:  A Study of Power, Loyalty, and Law. Knoxville, TN:  University of Tennessee Press, 1984.
Congressional Record-House, March 24, 1926:  6174-76; July 3, 1926:  13012-15.
Rosenberg, Albert and Cindy Armstrong, The American Gladiators:  Taft Versus Remus. Hemet, CA:  Aimwell Press, 1995.

1891 births
1968 deaths
Federal Bureau of Investigation agents